Mao Wanchun (born October 1961) is a Chinese politician who is the current chairman of the Hunan Provincial Committee of the Chinese People's Political Consultative Conference. He served as Chairman of the Hainan Provincial Committee of the Chinese People's Political Consultative Conference from January 2018 to January 2023. He was formerly Deputy Party Secretary of Shaanxi province. Mao spent much of his early career in his native Henan province, where he served as Party Chief of Luoyang.

Biography
Mao was born in Tangyin County, Henan. He worked as a sent-down youth during the Cultural Revolution. He attended Henan University, where he obtained a degree in political instruction.  His political career grew from his involvement in the Communist Youth League, becoming county governor of Lin County in 1991, at 30 years of age. In 1994, Mao became party chief of the newly founded city of Linzhou. He later served as deputy party chief of Zhoukou, mayor of Xuchang, then party chief of Xuchang. In July 2010 he was named to the provincial Party Standing Committee of Henan province, and became party chief of Luoyang.

Having entered the Central Committee as an alternate member in November 2012, in May the following year, Mao was tapped to replace Li Jinbin as the Organization Department head in Shaanxi province, leaving his native province for the first time. In August 2014, under Mao's leadership, the Shaanxi party leadership released a set of guidelines on the disclosure of assets of newly promoted public officials, the first province to issue guidelines of this kind. In October 2014, Mao was elevated from alternate to full membership on the committee after the expulsion of Jiang Jiemin from the body due to corruption.

In January 2023, he was transferred to Hunan and appointed chairman of the Hunan Provincial Committee of the Chinese People's Political Consultative Conference.

Mao was the third-ranked alternate member of the 18th Central Committee of the Communist Party of China, meaning he received an overwhelming number of confirmation votes for his Central Committee membership at the 18th Party Congress in November 2012. In 2017 he was again elected an alternate member of the 19th Central Committee; however this time his ranking had dropped significantly on the list.

References

1961 births
Politicians from Anyang
Living people
Henan University alumni
Alternate members of the 18th Central Committee of the Chinese Communist Party
Alternate members of the 19th Central Committee of the Chinese Communist Party
Deputy Communist Party secretaries of Shaanxi